Ančka Goropenko (29 October 1914 – July 2005) was a Slovenian-Yugoslavian gymnast. She competed in the women's artistic team all-around event at the 1936 Summer Olympics.

References

External links
 

1914 births
2005 deaths
Slovenian female artistic gymnasts
Olympic gymnasts of Yugoslavia
Gymnasts at the 1936 Summer Olympics
Sportspeople from Ljubljana